On 6 October 2021 34 civilians were murdered in attack on Matchka village in the Central African Republic.

Attack 
On 5 October 2021 around 12:00 a 18-wheeler truck carrying passengers and goods has left the city of Bambari for Alindao. At 13:00 the truck was stopped by group of armed men. They forced passengers to get out of bus and undress. They stripped them of all their belongings. They set fire to vehicle and two motorcycles. Then they opened fire on people killing many including men, women and children. After withdrawing armed men have killed three motorcycle drivers before disappearing. In video shared on social media one of attackers was shouting "Allah Akbar" reportedly imitating Arabic language. Gunfire from one side was also heard. By 7 October 2021 the number of casulties has risen to 34 deaths.

Responsibility 
Initially rebels from Union for Peace in the Central African Republic led by Ali Darassa were blamed for the massacre. According to RJDH-RCA Anti-balaka fighters allied with UPC also participated in the attack. On 10 October UPC officially denied responsibility for the massacre. On 15 October CorbeauNews identified General Kiri as responsible for the massacre. He belongs to UPC splinter faction led by Hassan Bouba.

External links 
 Alleged video from the massacre (originally posted by CorbeauNews, archived by Internet Archive)

References 

Central African Republic Civil War
Massacres in the Central African Republic
Massacres in 2021
October 2021 events in Africa
2021 in the Central African Republic